Puka Ranra (Quechua puka red, ranra stony; stony ground, "red, stony ground", hispanicized spelling Pucaranra) is a mountain in the Wansu mountain range in the Andes of Peru, about  high. It is located in the Apurímac Region, Antabamba Province, Juan Espinoza Medrano District, and in the Ayacucho Region, Parinacochas Province, Coronel Castañeda District.

References 

Mountains of Peru
Mountains of Apurímac Region
Mountains of Ayacucho Region